Atea is a deity in Polynesian mythologies.

Atea or ATEA may also refer to:

Places
 Atea (village), in Romania
 Atea, Zaragoza, a municipality in Spain
 Atea Cave, in Papua New Guinea

Organisations 
 ATEA, the Brazilian Association of Atheists and Agnostics
 ATEA, the Australian Telecommunications Employees Association

Other uses 
 Atea, the Spanish translation for the feminine form of atheist
 Ātea-1 and Ātea-2, rockets produced by Rocket Lab